Jean Le Moyne,  (February 17, 1913 – April 1, 1996) was a Canadian journalist, researcher, screenwriter and senator.

Born in Montreal, Quebec, in 1961 he wrote Convergences, winner of the 1961 Governor General's Award for French non-fiction. He won the Molson Prize in 1968.

On December 23, 1982 he was appointed to the Senate at the recommendation of Prime Minister Pierre Trudeau representing the senatorial division of Rigaud, Quebec. He retired on his 75th birthday on February 17, 1988. He sat as a Liberal.

In 1982, he was made an Officer of the Order of Canada "in recognition of his important contribution to Canadian humanities".

References

Further reading
 Quesnel, C. (2015). Rencontre de Jean Le Moyne, le mauvais contemporain. (PhD dissertation), Université McGill, Montréal 
 Thibault, G., & Hayward, M. (2014). Jean Le Moyne’s Itinéraire mécanologique: Machine Poetics, Reverie, and Technological Humanism. Canadian Literature: A Quarterly of Criticism and Review (221), 56-72.
 Thibault, G., & Hayward, M. (2017). Understanding Machines: A History of Canadian Mechanology. Canadian Journal of Communication, 42(3), 449-466.
 Thibault, G. (2017). Filming Simondon: The National Film Board, Education, and Humanism. Canadian Journal of Film Studies, 26(1), 1-23.
 Fonds Jean Le Moyne, Library and Archives Canada. The description of the fonds is in French.

External links
 
 Jean Le Moyne at The Canadian Encyclopedia
 Mécanologie Research portal by professors Mark Hayward (York University, Canada) and Ghislain Thibault (Université de Montréal, Canada) supported by the Social Sciences and Humanities Research Council on the history of Canadian Mechanology, including exploring the relationship between Le Moyne and French philosophers of techniques (Gilbert Simondon, Jacques Lafitte, Henri Van Lier).
 Fonds Jean Le Moyne (R6195) at Library and Archives Canada

1913 births
1996 deaths
Canadian senators from Quebec
Governor General's Award-winning non-fiction writers
Journalists from Montreal
Liberal Party of Canada senators
Officers of the Order of Canada
Politicians from Montreal
Writers from Montreal